Suicide is the second leading cause of death for people in the United States from the ages of 10 to 56.

In the United States, for the year 2005, the suicide rate for both males and females age 24 and below was lower than the rate for ages 25 and up.

According to the Center for Disease Control and Prevention (CDC), suicide is considered the second leading cause of death among college students, the second leading cause of death for people ages 25–34, and the fourth leading cause of death for adults between the ages of 18 and 65. In 2015, the CDC also stated that an estimated 9.3 million adults, which is roughly 4% of the United States population, had suicidal thoughts in one year alone. 1.3 million adults 18 and older attempted suicide in one year, with 1.1 million making plans to die by suicide. Looking at younger teenagers, suicide is the third leading cause of death of individuals aged from 10 to 14. Males and females are known to have different suicidal tendencies. For example, males take their lives almost four times the rate females do. Males also account for approximately 77.9% of all suicides, however, the female population is more likely to have thoughts of suicide than males. Males more commonly use a firearm to die by suicide, while females commonly use a form of poison. College students aged 18–22 are less likely to attempt suicide than teenagers. The most common suicide method among females aged 15 to 24 is suffocation according to Suicide Prevention Resource Center.

A recent study by the CDC with the help of Johns Hopkins University, Harvard, and Boston Children's Hospital has revealed that suicide rates dropping in certain states has been linked to the legalization of same sex marriage in those same states. Suicide rates as a whole fell about 7% but the rates among specifically gay, lesbian, and bisexual teenagers fell at a rate of 14%. In 2013, an estimated 494,169 people were treated in emergency departments for self-inflicted, nonfatal injuries, which left an estimated $10.4 billion in combined medical and work loss costs.

Suicide differs through the race and ethnic backgrounds. The Center for Disease Control and Prevention ranked suicide as the 8th leading cause for American Indians/Alaska Natives. Hispanic students in grades 9–12 have the following percentages: having seriously considered attempting suicide (18.9%), having made a plan about how they would attempt suicide (15.7%), having attempted suicide (11.3%), and having made a suicide attempt that resulted in an injury, poisoning, or overdose that required medical attention (4.1%). These percentages are consistently higher than white and black students.

Potential signs include threatening the well-being of oneself and others through physical violence, a desire to run away from home, property damage, giving away belongings, joking about/ referencing suicide, using drugs, isolating themselves, sleeping too much or too little, fatigue, despair, and extreme mood swings, among other things.  Parents witnessing such threats are recommended to immediately speak with their child and seek immediate mental health evaluation.

Population differences

Sex ratio

In the U.S, male adolescents die by suicide at a rate five times greater than that of female adolescents, although suicide attempts by females are three times as frequent as those by males. A possible reason for this is the method of attempted suicide for males is typically that of firearm use, with a 78–90% chance of fatality. Females are more likely to try a different method, such as ingesting poison. Females have more parasuicides.
This includes using different methods, such as drug overdose, which are usually less effective.

Ethnic groups
Suicide rates vary for different ethnic groups due to cultural differences. In 1998, suicides among European Americans accounted for 84% of all youth suicides, 61% male and 23% female. However, the suicide rate for Native Americans was 19.3 per 100,000, much higher than the overall rate (8.5 per 100,000). The suicide rate for African Americans has increased more than twofold since 1981. A national survey of high school students conducted in 1999 reported that Hispanic students are twice as likely to report attempted suicide than white students.

2007 study
On September 6, 2007, the Centers for Disease Control and Prevention reported suicide rate in American adolescents (especially boys, 10 to 24 years old) increased 8% (2003 to 2004), the largest jump in 15 years. Specifically, in 2004 there were 4,599 suicides in Americans ages 10 to 24, up from 4,232 in 2003, for a rate of 7.32 per 100,000 people that age. Before, the rate dropped to 6.78 per 100,000 in 2003 from 9.48 per 100,000 in 1990. Some psychiatrists argue that the increase is due to the decline in prescriptions of antidepressant drugs like Prozac to young people since 2003, leaving more cases of serious depression untreated. In a December 2006 study, The American Journal of Psychiatry said that a decrease in antidepressant prescriptions to minors of just a few percentage points coincided with a 14 percent increase in suicides in the United States; in the Netherlands, the suicide rate was 50% up, upon prescription drop.  Despite the language of the study, however, the results appear to have been directly conflicted by the actual suicide rates in subsequent years.  Youth suicide declined consistently every year from 2005 to 2007, and in 2007 reached a record low, even as the suicide rate for other groups increased.

LGBTQ+ youth
 For more information on this topic, please visit the main page 
Researchers have found that suicide attempts among lesbian, gay, bisexual
, transgender (LGBT) youth are comparatively higher than among the general population. LGBT teens and young adults have one of the highest rates of suicide attempts. According to some groups, this is linked to heterocentric cultures and institutionalized homophobia in some cases, including the use of LGBT people as a political wedge issue like in the contemporary efforts to halt legalizing same-sex marriages. Depression and drug use among LGBT people have both been shown to increase significantly after new laws that discriminate against gay people are passed. Bullying of LGBT youth has been shown to be a contributing factor in many suicides, even if not all of the attacks have been specifically addressing sexuality or gender.

Causes in teenage suicide
Teenage suicide is not caused by any one factor, but likely by a combination of them. Depression can play a massive role in teenage suicide. Some contributing factors include:

Eating disorders
Drug abuse
Sexual abuse/rape
Divorce of parents
Trauma
Household financial problems
Being bullied
Social rejection
Anger/guilt
Relationship breakup
Illness
Disability/deformations
Domestic violence or abuse
Academic failure in school and grade retention
Loneliness
Feelings of being misunderstood
Insecurities
Extreme mood swings
Loss of a loved one
Mental disorders such as major depressive disorder, bipolar disorder, body dysmorphic disorder, and schizophrenia.

Eating disorders have the highest correlation with a suicide rate of any mental illness, most commonly affecting teenagers (since data is correlational it is not possible to say with that A causes B, vice versa it may be possible a third variable is causing both, see Correlation and dependence). Teenagers with Eating Disorders' suicide risk is about 15%.
Perceived lack of parental interest is also a major factor in teenage suicide. According to one study, 90% of suicidal teenagers believed their families did not understand them.

Depression is the most common cause of suicide. About 75% of those individuals who die by suicide are depressed. Depression is caused by a number of factors, from chemical imbalances to psychological make-up to environmental influences.

There is a correlation between the use of social media and the increase in mental illness and teen suicide.  Recent studies are showing that there is a link between using social media platforms and depression and anxiety.  A recent national survey of 1787 young adults looked at the use of 11 different social media platforms.  The survey showed that the teens that used between 7 and 11 platforms were three times at risk for depression or anxiety.  Depression is one of the leading causes of suicide.  Another problem with teens and social media is cyberbullying.  When teens are on social media that can say whatever they want about anybody and they do not feel there are any repercussions for their actions.  They do not have to look their victims in the eyes and see the hurt and torment they are causing.  The link between cyberbullying and teen suicide is one reason that people are trying to criminalize cyberbullying.  In 2011 the US Center for Disease Control showed that 13.7% of teens that reported being cyberbullied had attempted suicide. A Facebook internal study found that 13.5% of teenage girls say Instagram makes thoughts of suicide worse.

Suicide prevention

Means reduction
Johnson and Coyne-Beasley have argued that limiting young people's access to lethal means, such as firearms, has reduced means-specific suicide rates. Child access prevention laws were put in place with the intention to reduce gun related deaths of those under the age of 17. CAP laws first focus is on negligent storage of firearms to encourage gun owners to safely store weapons and limit accessibility. CAP laws differ from state to state but can carry felony charges if there is an incident of negligent storage. The second focus is on the reckless provision of firearms which refers to children being given guns then having an accident. These laws were a response to high volumes of children dying by suicide, crimes, and accidents with the highest number of deaths in 1993. The highest rate per 100,000 was 4.87 children killed in firearm related incidents in 1993. The effects of these laws brought down firearm related incidents to 1.87 per 100,000 by 2009 which was a reduction from over 3000 deaths to 1400.

Suicide awareness programs
School-based youth suicide awareness programs have been developed to increase high-school students' awareness of the problem, provide knowledge about the behavioral characteristics of teens at risk (i.e., screening lists), and describe available treatment or counseling resources. However, the American Surgeon General David Satcher warned in 1999 that "indiscriminate suicide awareness efforts and overly inclusive screening lists may promote suicide as a possible solution to ordinary distress or suggest that suicidal thoughts and behaviors are normal responses to stress." The 1991 study Satcher cited (reference 45 in the report) for this claim, however, surveyed only two schools over 18 months, and the study's authors concluded that the suicide awareness program did not affect. Satcher's claim, while it may be correct, was not based on a consensus among public health professionals. The Canadian journal of public health references nine studies being done on the effects of awareness programs on teenagers. These studies were mainly conducted in the US showing five of them having positive effects on teenagers making them more likely to seek help. However, there was one study that had a negative impact making teenagers aware that suicide was a possible option rather than dealing with their problems. This study also found that males are more likely to suggest suicide as a solution rather than females.

Threats of suicide
The American Foundation for Suicide Prevention advocates taking suicide threats seriously. Seventy-five percent of all suicides are of people who have given some warning of their intentions to a friend or family member. SAVE, the Suicide Voices of Education Foundation, states that threats of suicide are the main warning factors for someone taking their own life. Warning factors include planning a suicide, talking about dying by suicide, or looking for weapons to harm themselves. These signs can mean that a person is in need of immediate attention from health officials or a suicide prevention organization. People who are at risk for suicide may be resistant to admit they have suicidal intentions because of the stigma that comes with mental illness. This is another obstacle of suicide prevention because people do not want to be labeled by their mental illness. Someone who is making threats may be helped by recommending they talk to their family, religious leaders, clinical professionals, or suicide prevention organizations.

Suicide survivors 
SAVE refers to people who have been affected by suicide, whether a friend or family member, as suicide survivors. Suicide begets suicide because the loss of a loved one can place that person at risk to take their own life. A 1993 study showed that suicide survivors had increased thoughts of suicide and other psychological problems such as PTSD. Clusters of suicides are often found in communities because it is a mental contagion that can influence others to commit the same act. To prevent clusters, the CDC created guidelines to intervene with those affected by these incidents. The people considered to have had a “Close” relationship with the victim should be given counseling as soon as possible and then be referred to any additional treatment if needed. The section below list treatments for at people at Risk.

Treatment
A common treatment for a young, suicidal patient is a combination of drug-based treatment (e.g. imipramine or fluoxetine) with a 'talking-based' therapy, such as referral to a cognitive behaviour therapist. This kind of therapy concentrates on modifying self-destructive and irrational thought processes.
In a crisis situation professional help can be sought, either at hospital or a walk-in clinic. There are also several telephone help numbers for help on teenage suicide, depending on one's location (country/state). In the US, dial 988 will connect to the nearest support hotline. Sometimes emergency services can be contacted.

See also
 Assisted suicide in the United States
 National Suicide Prevention Week
 Suicide in the United States
 Suicide among LGBT youth
 Youth suicide
 13 Reasons Why

References

External links 

 National Suicide Prevention Lifeline
 Parenting Teens Big database of links for help institutions.

 Youth in the United States
 Suicide in the United States
 United States